Viscount Stansgate, of Stansgate in the County of Essex, is a title in the Peerage of the United Kingdom. It was created in 1942 for the Labour politician, former Secretary of State for India and future Secretary of State for Air, William Wedgwood Benn. He was the second son of Sir John Benn, 1st Baronet, of The Old Knoll. Stansgate's eldest son and heir apparent, Michael Benn, was later killed in the Second World War. Consequently, he was succeeded in the title by his second son, the Labour politician Tony Benn, who disclaimed the peerage on 31 July 1963, the day the Peerage Act 1963 passed into law and made it possible for him to do so. , the title is held by Tony Benn's eldest son, Stephen Benn, 3rd Viscount Stansgate.

Stansgate is a hamlet near the village of Steeple, Essex, on the southern side of the River Blackwater estuary. The village has been home to several generations of the Benn family since about 1900. They live in Stansgate Abbey, described by Chris Mullin as "an ungainly, rambling 1920s house in a stunning location".

Viscounts Stansgate (1942—)

  William Wedgwood Benn, 1st Viscount Stansgate (1877–1960)
 Hon. Michael Julius Wedgwood Benn (1921—1944)
  Anthony Neil Wedgwood Benn, 2nd Viscount Stansgate (1925–2014) (disclaimed 1963)
  Stephen Michael Wedgwood Benn, 3rd Viscount Stansgate (1951—)
 (1) Hon. Daniel John Wedgwood Benn (1991—)
 (2)  Hon. Hilary James Wedgwood Benn (1953—)
 (3) James Leon C. Benn (1983—)
 (4) Jonathan Anthony C. Benn (1987—)	
 (5) Hon. Joshua William Wedgwood Benn (1958—)
 (6) William Graydon F. Benn (1985—)
 (7) Zachary Daniel T. Benn (1995—)
 Hon. David Julian Wedgwood Benn (1928—2017)
 (8) Piers Michael Wedgwood Benn (1962—)

The heir apparent is the present holder's son, the Hon. Daniel John Wedgwood Benn (born 1991).

The heir apparent's heir presumptive is the present holder's brother, the  Hon. Hilary James Wedgwood Benn (born 1953).

See also
Benn baronets, of The Old Knoll

References

Kidd, Charles, Williamson, David (editors). Debrett's Peerage and Baronetage (1990 edition). New York: St Martin's Press, 1990.

Viscountcies in the Peerage of the United Kingdom
Noble titles created in 1942
Benn family
Tony Benn